Great Void can refer to:

Astronomy
 A "super void", large empty regions of spaces
 Boötes Void, a supervoid in Bootes constellation
 Giant Void, a supervoid in the Canes Venatici constellation
 CMB cold spot, a supervoid in Eridanus constellation
Outer space in general

Other
 At the Edge of the Great Void, the nineteenth volume of the Valérian and Laureline series
 A region in the Crystalicum RPG card game
 "Eoarchaean: The Great Void", a song by The Ocean Collective, from the album Precambrian
 Greetings from the Great Void, an album from the Italian duo My Cat Is an Alien
 Purgatory in the after-life